“Heaven Can Wait" is a song recorded by Michael Jackson, originally released on his 2001 studio album Invincible. The song was written by Jackson, Teddy Riley, Andreao Heard, Nate Smith, Teron Beal, Eritza Laues and Kenny Quiller.

Background
The song was originally written by Teddy Riley for BLACKstreet's 1999 album Finally. However, while writing the song with Jackson, the singer asked Riley to give this song to him for he wanted that song, and needed that song in his life. Riley agreed with him and the song was listed in Michael's 2001 album Invincible. In an interview with Hip-Hop Wired, Riley talked about the recording sessions of the song: "What I did with Michael doing strings on 'Heaven Can Wait,' was like, we did the track first, that all took one day, and then the string section and then we did the guitar session and that's about three days. So the modern day is a little quick." After receiving a digital release on October 30, 2001, "Heaven Can Wait" was scheduled for release to radio stations across the United States, but was cancelled due to unspecified reasons. At a tempo of 59 beats per minute, it is one of Jackson's slowest songs.

Reception
The song received mixed reviews from most music critics. Mark Anthony Neal of SeeingBlack.com praised the song, saying, "[Heaven Can Wait] features arguably one of Jackson's best vocal performance since Thriller'''s 'The Lady in My Life.'" Milena Brown of PRessure PR thought the song was "breathless", and "clearly did not get the same recognition it deserved". Bill Johnson from The Urban Daily thought "Heaven Can Wait" kept Invincible "simple and smooth that excel the most". Robert Hilburn of Los Angeles Times said the song was "a tale about turning away an angel who comes to take him to heaven because he wants to stay with his darling, seem aimed at the lower end of 'N Sync's fan base -a difficult stretch for a man of 43." NME gave a mixed review to the song, saying "around this point you realise that Jackson is no longer pioneering - this would be a good Usher ballad. It has classic 'if I should die tonight' love lyrics and swelling chords, but doesn't add up to all that much." The song charted for 16 weeks on the Billboard Hot R&B/Hip-Hop Songs, peaking at number 72 on April 27, 2002.

Charts

Personnel
 Written and composed by Michael Jackson, Teddy Riley, Andreao Heard, Nate Smith, Teron Beal, Eritza Laues and Kenny Quiller
 Produced by Michael Jackson and Teddy Riley
 Co-Produced by Andreao Heard and Nate Smith
 Lead and background vocals by Michael Jackson
 Additional background vocals by Dr. Freeze and "Que"
 Orchestra arranged and conducted by Jeremy Lubbock
 Recorded and mixed by Teddy Riley, Bruce Swedien and George Mayers
 Digital editing by Teddy Riley and George Mayers

Cover versions

BLACKstreet version
The song was originally intended for BLACKstreet, originally lined up to their 1999 album Finally, but it was given to Jackson when he asked for it after hearing its demo.  In an interview with The Urban Daily'' on December 12, 2010, Riley confirmed that the upcoming album from Blackstreet will feature a cover of "Heaven Can Wait". He said "Blackstreet is gonna do something incredible with that song." However, Riley stated in 2006 to re-make the song, for a new BLACKstreet album, but the new album did not finish until 2011.

References

2000s ballads
2001 songs
Michael Jackson songs
Songs written by Michael Jackson
Pop ballads
Contemporary R&B ballads
Song recordings produced by Teddy Riley
Song recordings produced by Michael Jackson
Songs written by Teddy Riley
Songs written by Teron Beal
Songs written by Andreao Heard
Songs about death